Don't Call Me Charlie! is an American sitcom that aired on NBC during the 1962-1963 television season on Friday nights from 9:30 pm to 10:00 pm Eastern Time. Created by Don McGuire, the 18-episode series starred Josh Peine, Linda Lawson, John Hubbard, Arte Johnson, Penny Santon, Cully Richards, Louise Glenn, and Alan Napier.

Synopsis
Dr. Judson McKay (Josh Peine) is a small-town veterinarian from Muscatine, Iowa, who suddenly gets drafted into the United States Army and finds himself stationed as a private at an Army veterinary post in Paris. Upon arriving, Judson finds that the officer in charge of his post, Colonel U. Charles Barker (John Hubbard), had requested a bandmaster who played the trombone to be sent to the unit, but due to a clerical error Judson had been assigned to Barker instead.

Judson′s fellow soldiers attempt to get him to change his small-town ways, but he refuses to let the sophistication of Europe change him. Misadventures ensue as he tries to remain the simple country boy he had been in Muscatine, often leading to conflicts with Colonel Barker. Among the soldiers Judson serves with in addition to Colonel Barker are First Sergeant Stanley Wozniak (Cully Richard) and Corporal Lefkowitz (Arte Johnson). General Steele (Alan Napier) is Colonel Barker′s superior officer. Patricia Perry (Linda Lawson) is General Steele′s secretary, Selma Yossarian (Louise Glenn) is Colonel Barker′s secretary, and Madame Fatime (Penny Santon) is the concierge.

The Army veterinary station sees little action, and Colonel Barker has a lot of free time. Barker is pompous, but friendly with the troops under his command and loves to play gin rummy. Barker hates to be called "Charlie" and often tells people, "Don't call me Charlie!"

Cast
 Josh Peine as Judson McKay, D.V.M.
 Louise Glenn as Selma Yossarian
 John Hubbard as Colonel U. Charles Barker
 Arte Johnson as Corporal Lefkowitz
 Linda Lawson as Pat Perry
 Alan Napier as General Steele
 Cully Richards as First Sergeant Stanley Wozniak
 Penny Santon as Madame Fatime

Production

The series originally was titled Vive Judson McKay! after its main character, but advance surveys showed that potential viewers thought it was going to be a series about a Mexican revolutionary. The title was changed to Don't Call Me Charlie!

Don McGuire, who previously had created, co-produced, directed, and written scripts for the 1959–1962 military comedy-drama series Hennesey, also created, produced, directed, and wrote for Don't Call Me Charlie! and guest-starred in the 1962 episode "Play It, Sam." Frank Inn trained the many animals used in Don′t Call Me Charlie!

Reception

Just after Don't Call Me Charlie!′s eighth episode was broadcast in mid-November 1962, United Press International distributed a scathing review of the series by critic Rick Du Brow titled "Don't Call It Comedy." Describing the show as "daringly billed as comedy," a "catastrophe," and "a witless, amateurish abortion," Du Brow asserted that "anyone who comes in contact with Don′t Call Me Charlie! is bound to suffer," that it "putrefies the public property that is the airwaves," and that it would be best if the show were "removed from the air instantly." Du Brow wrote that "of the writing, directing, and acting, there is much to say, but none of it fit for print." He described Peine′s portrayal of Judson McKay as "stiff and high-schoolish" and claimed that the show′s creators realized it and had moved toward making John Hubbard′s Colonel Barker character the show′s star as a result. Du Brow also wondered why the series was set in Paris when no depiction whatsoever of Paris occurred in its episodes, speculating that the worsening reputation of Charles de Gaulle at the time had prompted producers to minimize references to modern-day France.

Broadcast history

Don′t Call Me Charlie! premiered on NBC on September 21, 1962. Its last original episode aired on January 25, 1963. Of the 26 episodes filmed, only 18 were broadcast.

Episodes
SOURCE

References

External links
  
 Don't Call Me Charlie! opening credits on YouTube
 Don't Call Me Charlie! closing credits on YouTube

1960s American sitcoms
1962 American television series debuts
1963 American television series endings
Black-and-white American television shows
Military humor in film
American military television series
Military comedy television series
NBC original programming
Television shows set in Paris
Television series by Universal Television